138 East 50th Street, officially named The Centrale, is a residential building in Midtown Manhattan, New York City. The developers planned to sell the condominiums for a total of $535.7 million, or an average of $4.3 million per unit.

History

Extell Development Company purchased the site in January 2012 for $61 million and sold it to Ceruzzi Properties in August 2014. Initial plans filed in June 2014 indicated the building would be a 52-story,  hotel with 764 rooms designed by SLCE Architects. However, renderings revealed in September 2015 showed the tower would be a 64-story,  condominium tower. In 2015, the developers secured a $65 million loan on the development's land from Industrial and Commercial Bank of China.

Construction began in mid-2016 and topped out during November 2017. In August 2017, the developers received a $300 million construction loan from Madison Realty Capital. The building was completed in early 2019. In February 2020, Korean firm Meritz Securities provided a $350 million inventory loan against the building's remaining unsold condominiums.

See also
List of tallest buildings in New York City

References

External links

The Centrale at the Skyscraper Center

2019 establishments in New York City
2010s in Manhattan
César Pelli buildings
Midtown Manhattan
Residential buildings completed in 2019
Residential condominiums in New York City
Residential skyscrapers in Manhattan